Miss World Ecuador 2017, the 5th edition of the Miss World Ecuador was held on July 16, 2017 in Machala, Ecuador. Mirka Cabrera from El Oro crowned Romina Zeballos Avellán as her successor, Miss World Ecuador 2017. The contest was directed by Tahíz Panús, and Julián Pico was the general producer. A guest star was Yaritza Reyes, who represented the Dominican Republic at Miss World 2016 in Washington, D.C. in 2016.

Results

Placements

Special awards

Contestants

Notes

Debuts

 Chimborazo
 Orellana
 Pastaza

Returns

Last compete in:

2015 
  Cotopaxi
  Morona Santiago
  Tungurahua

Withdraws

  Bolívar
 Carchi

Did not compete

 Imbabura -  María José Villacís

Crossovers
Katherine Valverde finished as 3rd Runner-up at Reina de Riobamba 2015.
Jenny Suriaga was Reina de Pasaje 2010, and Reina de El Oro2010. In 2011, she won Reina Mundial del Banano Ecuador and competed at Reina Mundial del Banano 2011 where she was unplaced.
Alexandra Zambrano competed at Reina de Esmeraldas 2013, but she was unplaced.
Romina Zeballos was Reina de Guayaquil 2012.
Davidia Olvera was the 1st Runner-up  at Reina de Quevedo 2015.
Andrea García was Reina de Marcelino Maridueña 2013, and was the 4th Runner-up at Reina del Guayas 2014.

References

Beauty pageants in Ecuador
2017
2017 beauty pageants